Raymond E. Holmberg (born December 10, 1943) is an American politician in the state of North Dakota. He was a member of the North Dakota State Senate from 1976 to 2022, representing the 17th district. He holds a bachelor's and master's degree in sciences from the University of North Dakota. Upon the retirement of Wisconsinite Fred Risser, Holmberg, along with South Carolinian Nikki Setzler, became the country's longest serving State Senator.

In March 2022, Holmberg announced that he would not be running for another term in the North Dakota Senate. On April 22, 2022, he resigned as chairman of Legislative Management Committee, a committee that oversees the North Dakota Legislature's work between sessions, after it was reported that he had exchanged 72 text messages with a man in jail facing federal child pornography charges. On April 25, Holmberg announced he would resign from the senate altogether, effective June 1, 2022. The North Dakota Republican District 17 Executive Committee appointed Jonathan Sickler, the endorsed candidate for the 2022 general election, to the vacancy.

Homlberg was one of North Dakota's three Republican electors to vote in the Electoral College in the 2020 presidential election.

References

1943 births
North Dakota Republicans
Politicians from Grand Forks, North Dakota
University of North Dakota alumni
Living people
21st-century American politicians
2020 United States presidential electors
20th-century American politicians